Garcinia zeylanica is a terrestrial species of flowering plant in the family Clusiaceae. It is found only in Sri Lanka, where it can be seen only in three forest localities.

References

Endemic flora of Sri Lanka
Endangered plants
zeylanica
Taxonomy articles created by Polbot
Plants described in 1820